A list of films produced in Italy in 1924 (see 1924 in film):

See also
List of Italian films of 1923
List of Italian films of 1925

External links
 Italian films of 1924 at the Internet Movie Database

Italian
1924
Films